Stanley B. Weaver (May 23, 1925 – November 11, 2003) was an American funeral director and Republican politician active in Illinois.

Weaver was born May 23, 1925 in Harrisburg, Illinois. He graduated from Urbana High School in Urbana, Illinois. He served in the United States Army Air Corps in the Pacific theater during World War II. He attended Michigan State College, University of Illinois, and graduated from the Indiana College of Mortuary Science. He was elected Mayor of Urbana in 1957 and served until 1969. During his tenure as mayor, he served as President of the Illinois Municipal League. He then served in the Illinois House of Representatives from 1969 to 1971. From 1971 until 2003, Weaver served in the Illinois State Senate. In 1977, Weaver joined Republican leadership in the Illinois Senate and would continue to serve in various leadership positions for the remainder of his time in office. In 1997, he was elevated to the newly created post of Senate Majority Leader.

Weaver died of cancer in Urbana, Illinois. The portion of U.S. Route 45 in Illinois that goes through Urbana-Champaign is named in his honor.

Notes

1925 births
2003 deaths
People from Harrisburg, Illinois
People from Urbana, Illinois
Military personnel from Illinois
United States Army Air Forces soldiers
Michigan State University alumni
University of Illinois alumni
American funeral directors
Mayors of places in Illinois
Republican Party members of the Illinois House of Representatives
Republican Party Illinois state senators
Deaths from cancer in Illinois
20th-century American politicians